The Coenobitidae are the family of terrestrial hermit crabs, widely known for their land-living habits as adults. They are found in coastal tropical regions around the world and require access to the ocean to breed.

Although coenobitids are fully terrestrial as adults, they spend their marine life as planktonic larvae. Female coenobitids return to the sea to hatch their eggs and their larvae develop through planktonic zoeal stages to a megalopa, in a similar way as the marine hermit crabs. Just like these species, after settlement, terrestrial hermit crabs megalopae recognize and co-opt gastropods shells, before migrating into the land and molting to the first crab stage.

The 17 species are placed in two genera:

References

 Hamasaki, K., Iizuka, C., Sanda, T., Imai, H. and Kitada, S. (2017), Phylogeny and phylogeography of the land hermit crab Coenobita purpureus (Decapoda: Anomura: Coenobitidae) in the Northwestern Pacific Region. Mar Ecol, 38: e12369.

External links

Hermit crabs
Terrestrial crustaceans
Decapod families